The Magritte Award for Best Supporting Actress (French: Magritte de la meilleure actrice dans un second rôle) is an award presented annually by the Académie André Delvaux. It is given in honor of an actress who has delivered an outstanding performance in a supporting role while working within the film industry. It is one of the Magritte Awards, which were established to recognize excellence in Belgian cinematic achievements. 

The 1st Magritte Awards ceremony was held in 2011 with Christelle Cornil receiving the award for her role in Illegal. As of the 2022 ceremony, Laura Verlinden is the most recent winner in this category for her role in Playground.

Winners and nominees
In the list below, winners are listed first in the colored row, followed by the other nominees.

2010s

2020s

References

External links
 Magritte Awards official website
 Magritte Award for Best Supporting Actress at AlloCiné

Supporting Actress
Film awards for supporting actress